Bradfield Woods is an  biological Site of Special Scientific Interest between Bury St Edmunds and Stowmarket in Suffolk. The site is in three separate blocks, the adjoining Felsham Hall and Monkspark Woods, and the much smaller separate Hedge Wood and Chensil Grove. Felsham Hall and Monkspark Woods are designated a 63.3 National Nature Reserve, also called Bradfield Woods, and are managed by the Suffolk Wildlife Trust.

These woods have a history of coppicing dating to before 1252, producing a very high diversity of flora, with over 370 plant species recorded. Uncommon woodland flowers include oxlip, herb paris and ramson. There is also a rich variety of fungi, with two species not recorded elsewhere in Britain.

There is access from Felsham Road west of Gedding.

References

Suffolk Wildlife Trust
Sites of Special Scientific Interest in Suffolk
National nature reserves in England